At Last is the second studio album by actress and singer Lynda Carter, released on June 9, 2009, her first album in 31 years.

Track listing
"You Send Me" (Sam Cooke) – 3:47
"Where Did Our Love Go" (Lamont Dozier, Brian Holland, Eddie Holland) – 3:44
"'Deed I Do" (Walter Hirsch, Fred Rose) – 2:10 
"Million Dollar Secret" (Helen Humes, Justin Taub) – 3:34
"Cry Me a River" (Arthur Hamilton) – 3:56
"Secret of Life" (James Taylor) – 3:01
"Blues in the Night" (Harold Arlen, Johnny Mercer) – 3:41
"Come Rain or Come Shine Medley" (Harold Arlen, Kern Hammerstein, Johnny Mercer) – 3:38
"At Last" (Mack Gordon, Harry Warren) – 2:51
"Summer Time" (George Gershwin, Ira Gershwin, DuBose Heyward) – 2:30
"Cloudburst" (Jimmy Harris) – 2:39
"Oldies Medley" (Dorothy Fields, Herman Hupfeld, Jerome Kern, Ray Noble) – 3:39

Personnel 

Wayne Bergeron – trumpet
Lynda Carter – executive producer
John Carter Cash – producer
Johnny Harris - producer
Charlie Chadwick – bass
Pete Christlieb – clarinet, saxophone, woodwind
Melodie Crittenden – backing vocals
Robert O' Donnell – trumpet
Peter Erskine – drums
Daniel Fornero – trumpet
Larry Hall – trumpet
Tony Harrell – organ, guitar, piano, keyboards
Johnny Harris – arranger
Jim Hoke – flute, arranger, saxophone, woodwind
David Hungate – bass
Alexander Iles – trombone
Munyungo Jackson – percussion
Alan Kaplin – bass trombone
Kyle Lehning – engineer, mixing
Paul Leim – percussion, drums, producer, project coordinator
Kimberly Levitan – package design
Kerry Marks – guitar
Keith Munyan – photography
Sangwook "Sunny" Nam – mastering
Robert O'Donnell, Jr. – trumpet
Dean Parks – guitar
Andy Reiss – guitar
Michael Rhodes – bass
Lisa Silver – backing vocals
Harry Stinson – drums
Chuck Turner – engineer
Cindy Walker – backing vocals
Ken Wild – bass
Casey Wood – assistant

Charts

References

2009 albums
Jazz albums by American artists
Lynda Carter albums
Covers albums